Patrick Rakovsky (born 2 June 1993) is a German professional footballer who plays as a goalkeeper for Phoenix Rising FC in the USL Championship.

Rakovsky joined Orange County SC of the USL Championship in December 2020. In 2021, Rakovsky and Orange County won the 2021 USL Championship Final.

On January 17, 2023, Rakovsky signed with Phoenix Rising FC.

Honours
Individual
 Fritz Walter Medal U19 Bronze: 2012

References

External links
 Patrick Rakovsky at fcn.de 
 
 

1993 births
Living people
German footballers
Germany youth international footballers
German people of Czech descent
Association football goalkeepers
Bundesliga players
2. Bundesliga players
FC Schalke 04 players
1. FC Nürnberg II players
1. FC Nürnberg players
Lierse S.K. players
FC Lahti players
Orange County SC players
Phoenix Rising FC players
Challenger Pro League players
Veikkausliiga players
German expatriate footballers
German expatriate sportspeople in Belgium
Expatriate footballers in Belgium
German expatriate sportspeople in Finland
Expatriate footballers in Finland
German expatriate sportspeople in the United States
Expatriate soccer players in the United States